Peter Chapman (born January 1977) is an English convicted murderer who has featured heavily in the media in the United Kingdom and has become known as the "Facebook Killer". He was jailed for a minimum of 35 years in March 2010 for the October 2009 rape, kidnap, and murder of 17-year-old Ashleigh Hall. His crime has led to serious criticism of police monitoring of offenders, and of Facebook.

Life prior to the murder of Ashleigh Hall
Peter Chapman was born in Darlington and was brought up by his grandparents in neighbouring Stockton-on-Tees before moving to Liverpool in 2005 aged 26. Chapman returned to County Durham in 2007 and had been charged with sexual offences before the murder of Ashleigh Hall prior to moving to Merseyside when Chapman was living in Middlesbrough. He was first investigated at the age of 15, and four years later he received a seven-year prison sentence for raping two sex workers at knifepoint. He was released in 2001, and had eventually fallen off the 'police radar.' This has led to serious criticism and a report to the Independent Police Complaints Commission. He has been convicted of motoring offences and theft.

The murder of Ashleigh Hall
Chapman used a fake Facebook profile, impersonating a teenage boy, to befriend Ashleigh Hall, a 17-year-old student from Darlington. In reality, he was a 33-year-old man living in his car. She met him on 25 October 2009 and according to the prosecution, "When she met him on 25 October last year, he kidnapped, raped and murdered her". Following the rape and murder of Ashleigh Hall, Chapman dumped the teenager's body in a field near a layby on the A177, close to the services near Sedgefield, County Durham. Following his conviction Peter Chapman is being held at HM Frankland High Security Prison the United Kingdom's largest category A prison; located in County Durham not far from where he raped and murdered Ashleigh Hall in 2009.

Facebook's response
On 3 March 2010, Facebook, as a direct response to the killing, warned under-18 users not to meet people from the internet, and gave advice on how to stay safe online. They also said they were "deeply saddened".

References

1977 births
Living people
20th-century English criminals
21st-century English criminals
British people convicted of theft
Date of birth missing (living people)
English people convicted of murder
English people convicted of rape
2009 murders in the United Kingdom
English prisoners sentenced to life imprisonment
People from Kirkby
People from Darlington
Prisoners sentenced to life imprisonment by England and Wales
People convicted of murder by England and Wales
Facebook criticisms and controversies
2009 in England